Michael Cooper (born 15 September 1988) is an English professional rugby league footballer who plays as a  and  for the Wigan Warriors in the Betfred Super League, and for the England Knights and England at international level. 

He previously played for the Warrington Wolves in two separate spells in the Super League, and spent time away from Warrington at the Castleford Tigers in the Super League. Cooper has also played for the St. George Illawarra Dragons in the NRL.

Background
Cooper was born in Warrington, Cheshire, England.

Early career

Born in Warrington, Cooper began his career with Warrington when he was a part of an under-11s side who went through a whole season undefeated, winning the championship along the way. He continued through the junior ranks and eventually become part of the first team.

Warrington Wolves

He played in the 2012 Super League Grand Final defeat by Leeds at Old Trafford.

Cooper played in the 2013 Super League Grand Final defeat by Wigan at Old Trafford.

Castleford Tigers
Cooper had a loan period at Castleford in 2010. While at Castleford he got some regular first team action, due to Castleford's injury situation.

St. George Illawarra Dragons 
St. George Illawarra signed Cooper on a two-year deal. The St. George club agreed to a release fee with Warrington to sign the then 24-year-old, who had been under contract to the wire through until the end of the 2014 season.

The St. George Illawarra  missed only one match during his début season in the NRL. Cooper played 14 games off the bench as an interchange  and nine games starting on the run-on side. Cooper scored one try which came against the New Zealand Warriors in round 7, and in the same game made his only line-break. Cooper ended the season with an average of 44.2 minutes played per game. He also made 237 runs, and 2,058 metres. He has the best tackles to missed tackles ratio, with an average of 28.1 tackles a game, with only 0.9 missed.

Warrington Wolves
In June 2016, it was announced that Cooper would be returning to Warrington on a three-year deal for the start of the 2017 campaign.

Cooper played in the 2018 Challenge Cup Final defeat by the Catalans Dragons at Wembley Stadium.
Cooper played in the 2018 Super League Grand Final defeat by Wigan at Old Trafford.

Cooper played in the 2019 Challenge Cup Final victory over St Helens at Wembley Stadium.

Wigan Warriors
Cooper joined Wigan in July 2022, with his departure from Warrington happening earlier than expected early after the initial deal was due to take place at end of the 2022 season.

International career
Cooper played for the England Knights in 2011 and 2012.  

Cooper was selected in England's 24-man squad for the 2014 Four Nations.

After being selected in England's 2014 Four Nations squad, but not featuring in a match, McNamara selected him again for the 2015 end-of-year test series against New Zealand. In a test match beforehand, Cooper made his début for England in England's win over France.

In October 2016, Cooper was selected in England's 24-man squad for the 2016 Four Nations. Before the tournament began, he featured in England's test match against France.

In October he was named in the England squad for the 2021 Rugby League World Cup.

References

External links

Warrington Wolves profile
(archived by web.archive.org) 2015 St. George Illawarra Dragons profile
Planning for life after rugby
Mikes RunGeek store
Mikes 1895Sports store
(archived by web.archive.org) Profile at warringtonwolves.org
(archived by web.archive.org) Statistics at thecastlefordtigers.co.uk
SL profile
England profile

1988 births
Living people
Castleford Tigers players
England Knights national rugby league team players
England national rugby league team players
English rugby league players
Rugby league locks
Rugby league players from Warrington
Rugby league props
Rugby league second-rows
St. George Illawarra Dragons players
Warrington Wolves players
Wigan Warriors players